Wolfgang Fikentscher (17 May 1928–12 March 2015) was a German jurist and legal anthropologist.

Life 
Fikentscher was born in Nuremberg, Germany. He earned his Dr. juris (1952) and S.J.D. (1957) at Ludwig Maximilian University of Munich/Germany. His professional career began as assistant in the law department of Wackerchemie (Munich), at that time under Allied IG Farben control, and as teacher of labor law at trade union schools (Kochel and Niederpoecking/Bavaria). In 1952, he received the degree of LL.M at University of Michigan Law School (Ann Arbor, Mich.) In 1957, he was appointed full professor at University of Münster School of Law. In 1965, he went to University of Tübingen and in 1971 to Munich, holding a chair for civil and commercial law, intellectual property and copyright law, and comparative law, until being emerited in 1996. Since then he teaches the anthropology of law at Munich University Law School as an adjunct, intermittently (1996–2000) also as a guest professor at University of California at Berkeley School of Law. 

Since 1972, Fikentscher is External Scientific Member of Max Planck-Institute for Intellectual Property and Competition Law, Munich, working on competition law in developing countries and on the laws controlling market domination. In 1977, he was elected ordinary member of Bavarian Academy of Humanities and Sciences, Philosophical-Historical Class, Munich, chairing its Commission on Studies in Cultural Anthropology. In 1994, he was granted, together with Professor Robert D. Cooter, Berkeley, the Max-Planck Research Prize for fieldwork and publications in Native American tribal law. Fikentscher holds the Federal Cross of Merit 1st Class of the Federal Republic of Germany, and the Bavarian Order of Merit. In 1995, he was awarded the degree of Doctor juris honoris causa of the University of Zurich/Switzerland. 

Memberships, fellowships: Humanwissenschaftliches Zentrum, University of Munich; Parmenides Foundation for the Study of Thinking, Munich; Netherlands Institute for Advanced Study in the Humanities and Social Sciences, Wassenaar/Netherlands (1971/72); Santa Fe Institute, Santa Fe, N.M. (1992/93, 1995/96, 2002); Gruter Institute for Law and Behavioral Research, Portola Valley, Calif. (since 1992). Guest professorships: Georgetown University Law Center, Washington, D.C. (1962, 1966); University of Michigan School of Law, Ann Arbor, Mich. (1955, 1987); Yale Law School and Yale's Department of Anthropology, New Haven, Conn. 1986; University of Nanjing (1993); University of California School of Law, Berkeley, Calif. (1980/81, 1988; 1992, 1996–2000). 

Fikentscher was married with Irmgard, née van den Berge, and has four children and four grandchildren.

Work 
Fikentscher's scientific work is focused on intellectual property law, competition law, comparative law and anthropology of law. His publications on antitrust law and international economic law were seminal and influenced German, Greek, European, Japanese and Taiwanese (RoChina) legislation and theory of competition law (PRChina). Fikentscher consulted German, European and UN authorities and the U.S. Senate on antitrust and unfair trade practices law. He authored a textbook on obligations (contracts, quasi contracts, torts). In his later years, Fikentscher contributed to the cultural anthropology of law, or comparative legal cultures, a field less known in Germany. He performed fieldwork, for example in Native American (especially South Western Pueblo) and Taiwanese aboriginal tribal legal cultures, trying to trace basic axioms of human legal and economic thinking.

Publications (selection) 
Law and Anthropology. Munich 2009: C. H. Beck & Bavarian Academy of Sciences
Modes of Thought. 1994, 2nd ed. 2004 Tübingen: Mohr Siebeck
Culture, Law and Economics: Three Berkeley Lectures. Berne & Durham, NC, 2004: Staempfli & Carolina Academic Press (CAP)
Die Freiheit und ihr Paradox. Graefelfing 1997: Dr. Resch
Demokratie - eine Einführung. Munich 1993: Serie Piper
Wirtschaftsrecht, vol. 1 Weltwirtschaftsrecht, Europäisches Wirtschaftsrecht, vol. 2 Deutsches Wirtschaftsrecht. Munich 1983: C. H. Beck (translated to Chinese Beijing 2010 by Zhang Shiming)
Methoden des Rechts in vergleichender Darstellung, vol. 1–5. Tübingen 1975–77: Mohr Siebeck
Wettbewerb und gewerblicher Rechtsschutz. Munich 1958: C. H. Beck
"A Theory of Legal Monopolies". LL.M. Paper, University of Michigan, Ann Arbor, Michigan. 1953
"Schadensersatz aus rechtswidrigem Streik unter besonderer Berücksichtigung des politischen Streiks". Unprint. doctoral thesis, Munich 1952

References

External links  
 
 selected works for download at bepress.com
 Schriftenverzeichnis
 Interview with Wolfgang Fikentscher (PDF-Datei)
 CV (vita=Lebenslauf)  Wolfgang Fikentscher (PDF-Datei)

Jurists from Bavaria
German anthropologists
2015 deaths
1928 births
People from Nuremberg
Ludwig Maximilian University of Munich alumni
University of Michigan Law School alumni
University of Münster alumni
University of Tübingen alumni
Academic staff of the Ludwig Maximilian University of Munich
UC Berkeley School of Law faculty
Academic staff of the University of Münster
University of Michigan faculty
Santa Fe Institute people
Officers Crosses of the Order of Merit of the Federal Republic of Germany